The Diciotti class is an Italian-designed offshore patrol vessel, presently in use with the Italian Coast Guard, Iraqi Navy, Armed Forces of Malta and Panama SENAN. These ships are designed and built by Fincantieri on the bay of La Spezia to Muggiano and Riva Trigoso shipyards.

Italian Coast Guard (Saettia Mk1 and Mk2)
Based on the earlier experimental Saettia class (Saettia MK1), the Diciotti class (Saettia MK2) is an advanced and improved version with a longer length, more power and hence greater patrol endurance.

Malta - Maritime Squadron AFM (Saettia Mk3)

In 2003, the Armed Forces of Malta ordered a replacement for the former East German Kondor class patrol boats P29, P30 and P31, due to the increase in flow of refugees from North Africa to Europe.

The design for P61 (Saettia MK3) provides a clear rear half to the ship, providing sufficient space with reinforcement to land a helicopter, up to the size of an AW139. P61 has the capability of carrying out patrols up to Sea State 5, and withstand sea conditions up to Sea State 7. It can launch a rib patrol boat via a rear launch ramp up to Sea State 4. This combination of modifications increases vessel weight to 450-tonnes, and reduces standard crew capacity to 25.

The €17m Euros contract, financed entirely from the 5th Italo-Maltese Financial Protocol, covered the construction of the vessel together with an associated training and logistic support package. The ship was commissioned on October 1, 2005 and operational from November 5, 2005. P61 acts as the flagship of the Armed Forces of Malta.

The vessel has been updated in 2017 with overhaul and engine refit (Caterpillar engines replace Isotta Fraschini engines), by Fincantieri, to a cost around €7 million.

On 5 June 2019 the P61 rescued the lives of 147 migrants after they‘ve been sending distress calls in the Maltese SAR area. In total AFM vessels rescued 370 immigrants on one of the busiest days in recent history for the navy. The other migrants were rescued by the P52 and the P21. 

On 11 June 2019, P61 rescued 97 migrants and brought them safely to Malta. This rescue comes less than a week after 147 migrants were rescued by this same vessel.   

On 24 August 2019, P61 brought to Malta a group of migrants totalling 356. This happened after Malta finally decided to give a safe port to these souls that were aboard the NGO vessel Ocean Viking for 14 consecutive days. The Maltese government said that all of the migrants will be relocated to other EU countries. This group happens to be the biggest arrival of the year to date.

Iraq (Saettia MK4)
In 2006, the new Iraqi Navy signed a contract with the Italian Government to purchase four modified Diciotti class vessels to patrol its 58 kilometre coast line.

The vessels are to be built by Fincantieri at Riva Trigoso, with modifications including increased crew capacity of 38. The contract also comprises the provision of logistical support and crew training with each crew completing a 7-week training course. In cooperation with the Marina Militare (Italian Navy), each commissioning crew is provided with a week’s bridge simulator course at the Naval Academy in Livorno.

In May 2009, the first vessel, Patrol Ship 701 named Fatah (Arabic for Victory), was handed over at the Muggiano, La Spezia shipyard. The crew had been training since January 2009, and now headed for Umm Qasr, a 20 day/5,000 nautical mile journey via the Mediterranean, Suez Canal and Red Sea. There, additional training was completed, before the vessel took over duties from the British Royal Marine patrols, who then reverted to training the new crew.

The vessels are used to patrol the exclusive economic zone, control maritime traffic, for search and rescue and fire fighting.

Panama - SENAN, National Air and Navy Service of Panama (Saettia Mk2)
Following an agreement reached in June 2010, Italy delivered CP 902 Ubaldo Diciotti and CP 903 Luigi Dattilo to SENAN - National Air and Navy Service of Panama as P 901 and P 902 in April 2014.

Vessels

See also

 Falaj 2-class patrol vessel - a more heavily armed patrol vessel based on the Diciotti.

References 

Patrol boat classes
Diciotti
Ships built by Fincantieri
Diciotti class